S.H.I.E.L.D. is a fictional spy agency featured in Marvel comics.

S.H.I.E.L.D. may also refer to:
S.H.I.E.L.D. (comic book), a comic book title by Marvel Comics
S.H.I.E.L.D. (2010 series), first series of the title
S.H.I.E.L.D. (2014 series), second series of the title
S.H.I.E.L.D. (Marvel Cinematic Universe), the Marvel Cinematic Universe organization based on the Marvel Comics counterpart
Joe Higgins, a version of the Shield (Archie Comics), uses the initials S.H.I.E.L.D. as his secret identity

See also
 Agents of S.H.I.E.L.D.
 Agents of S.H.I.E.L.D. (comic book)